Nicola Sabatino (also: Sabbatini and Sabatini; 1705–1796) was a Neapolitan composer.

Sabatino was born in Naples and became one of the late baroque Neapolitan composers centred on the Music conservatories of Naples and the opera at the Teatro di San Carlo typified by Porpora, Leonardo Leo, Francesco Durante. In November 1774 Sabatino directed his own music for the funeral of Niccolò Jommelli.

Works
Operas
Cleante (1752, Rome)
Arsace (30 May 1754, Naples)
Endimione (1758, Dublin)

Masses
 Mass 1726
 Mass 1728
Oratorios
 Jaele Venice 1743
Cantatas
 Cantata Laetamini fideles alto, 2vn., bc.
 Vola turtur de nido.
Instrumental
 Solo per violoncello, 2 violins and B.c.

References

1705 births
1796 deaths
Italian male classical composers
Italian opera composers
Male opera composers
18th-century Italian composers
18th-century Italian male musicians